The DGCR2 gene encodes the protein integral membrane protein DGCR2/IDD in humans.

Deletions of the 22q11.2 have been associated with a wide range of developmental defects (notably DiGeorge syndrome, velocardiofacial syndrome, conotruncal anomaly face syndrome and isolated conotruncal cardiac defects) classified under the acronym CATCH 22. The DGCR2 gene encodes a novel putative adhesion receptor protein, which could play a role in neural crest cells migration, a process which has been proposed to be altered in DiGeorge syndrome. DGCR2 is thought to interact with the Reelin complex to regulate corticogenesis.

References

Further reading

External links